Eugenio Romerica Abunda Jr. (born October 29, 1960), popularly known as Boy Abunda, is a Filipino professor, television host, publicist and talent manager. He earned the title "Asia's King of Talk" after his defunct program The Bottomline was hailed as the Best Talk Show for 2011 in the 16th Asian TV Awards.

Early life and education
Boy Abunda was born as Eugenio Romerica Abunda Jr. in Borongan. He attended Ateneo de Manila University, where he took up Business Management. However, he did not finish that course because of his father's death. He left Ateneo and worked in odd jobs to support himself.

He graduated from Philippine Women's University with degrees Bachelor of Arts in Communication Arts in 2009, Master of Arts in Communication Arts in 2011, and Doctor of Philosophy in Social Development in 2016.

Personal life
Abunda is openly gay and has been in a relationship with partner Elmer "Bong" Quintana since 1983. Although Abunda is a practicing Catholic and Marian devotee, he is a supporter of LGBT rights and same-sex marriage, expressing disagreement with the Church's stand on homosexuality. He denounced the 2016 Orlando Nightclub Shooting, which has been recorded as the deadliest incident of violence against LGBT people in the United States.

On June 23, 2010, Abunda became a part-time professor at Philippine Women's University, teaching radio and television to Communication Arts students. He currently resides in Quezon City.

Abunda's sister, Maria Fe Abunda, currently serves as a congresswoman for Eastern Samar. She had previously served as the mayor of Borongan.

In 2014, Abunda was hospitalised due to a liver problem.

Career 
At the Metropolitan Theater, he worked as a stage actor and eventually as an assistant stage manager. Later, he became the assistant of the theater's administrator Conchita "Tita Conching" Sunico, who taught him public relations. In a couple of years, he started Backroom, Inc managing singers and actresses and a public relations firm.  He also worked as public relations consultant for GMA Network. It was during Abunda's public relations work in GMA when one of its executives, Bobby Barreiro, suggested that he should try hosting a television show.

Abunda became a host of Show and Tell, a late night variety talk show with Gretchen Barretto, and Startalk, an entertainment talk show. He subsequently moved to GMA's competitor ABS-CBN in 1999, where he has hosted the following shows: The Buzz, Private Conversations, Homeboy, Kontrobersyal, SNN: Showbiz News Ngayon and The Bottomline with Boy Abunda, a talk show interview. He is also a newscaster for entertainment of the late-night news program Bandila. He also worked as a radio commentator for DZAR, during the Angel Radyo era. He is the founder and head of Asian Artists Agency, a talent management agency.

He also produced an album titled Melodic Conversations.

After 23 years in ABS-CBN, Abunda broke the speculations as he returned to his home network, GMA Network on December 15, 2022, as part of its retrenchment program caused by the ABS-CBN shutdown from the Philippine Congress that junked the new ABS-CBN legislative franchise to operate. He marked his free-to-air television comeback via Fast Talk with Boy Abunda in 2023. However, he returned to ABS-CBN to host the special Anim na Dekada… Nag iisang Vilma.

Filmography

Television and online

Films

Bibliography
 2014: Make Your Nanay Proud (ABS-CBN Publishing, Inc.)
 2017: It's Like This (ABS-CBN Publishing, Inc.)
 2018: Nanay's Gay Boy: Two Speeches (ABS-CBN Publishing, Inc.)

Accolades
Celebrity Inductee Winner, Eastwood City Walk Of Fame Philippines in 2010
3rd EdukCircle Awards - Most Influential Celebrity Endorser of Year (2013)
Winner, Best Showbiz Oriented Show Host - PMPC Star Awards for TV
Startalk (1995–1999)
The Buzz (1999–2008 and 2010) (tied with Paolo Bediones in 2005)
SNN: Showbiz News Ngayon (2009)
Hall of Fame (2011)
Winner, Best Public Affairs Program Host - PMPC Star Awards for TV
Private Conversations (2004)
The Bottomline With Boy Abunda (2010-2011, 2015, 2016, 2017, 2018)
Winner, Best Magazine Show Host - PMPC Star Awards for TV
Kontrobersyal (2004)
Winner, Best Celebrity Talk Show  Host - PMPC Star Awards for TV
Homeboy (2005–2007)
Boy and Kris (2008)
Winner, Best Talk Show Host - UPLB Gandingan Awards
Homeboy (2006)
Boy and Kris (2007–2008)

References

External links
Boy Abunda | Facebook Page

1958 births
Living people
People from Borongan
Filipino LGBT journalists
Filipino television presenters
Filipino television talk show hosts
Filipino Roman Catholics
Filipino LGBT entertainers
LGBT Roman Catholics
Filipino gay writers
Filipino LGBT rights activists
Philippine Women's University alumni
Ateneo de Manila University alumni
GMA Network (company) people
GMA Network personalities
ABS-CBN personalities
ABS-CBN News and Current Affairs people
Star Circle Quest
21st-century Filipino LGBT people
Waray-language writers